John Victor "Pete" Ferry (1914 – February 9, 1971) was a Canadian curler. He played as second on the 1954 Brier-winning Team Alberta, skipped by Matt Baldwin.

References

1914 births
1971 deaths
Brier champions
Curlers from Alberta
Canadian male curlers
20th-century Canadian people
People from Outlook, Saskatchewan